Toshihide Matsui and Frederik Nielsen were the defending champions but chose not to defend their title.

Hans Hach Verdugo and Adrián Menéndez Maceiras won the title after defeating Bradley Klahn and Sem Verbeek 7–6(8–6), 4–6, [10–5] in the final.

Seeds

Draw

References

External links
 Main draw

Knoxville Challenger - Doubles
2019 Doubles